The Fishing River is a  tributary of the Missouri River in western Missouri in the United States. It rises in the northeastern extremity of Kansas City in Clay County and flows generally eastward and southeastward through Clay and southeastern Ray counties, past the town of Mosby.

Downstream of Mosby, it collects the East Fork Fishing River, which rises at the town of Lawson and flows  generally southward through Ray and Clay counties, through the resort community of Crystal Lake and past the town of Excelsior Springs.

Fishing River was named for the fact it contained an abundance of fish.

In 1808, William Clark of the Lewis and Clark Expedition established Fort Osage along the Missouri near the mouth of the Fishing River.  The fort became a center of trade among European settlers and Native Americans in the region.

Location

Mouth Confluence with the Missouri River in Ray County, Missouri: 
Source Clay County, Missouri:

See also
List of Missouri rivers

References

Rivers of Missouri
Tributaries of the Missouri River
Rivers of Clay County, Missouri
Rivers of Ray County, Missouri